Patches from the Quilt is a digital EP released by Gym Class Heroes. It includes the singles "Cookie Jar" featuring R&B singer The-Dream and "Peace Sign/Index Down" featuring rapper Busta Rhymes and one new track that appeared on their album The Quilt, released on September 9, 2008.

Track listing
"Cookie Jar" (featuring The-Dream) - 3:35
"Peace Sign/Index Down" (featuring Busta Rhymes) - 4:03
"Blinded by the Sun" - 3:00

References

Gym Class Heroes albums
2008 EPs